Scruples is a 1980 American television miniseries based on the 1978 novel by Judith Krantz. It was produced by Warner Bros. Television and starred Lindsay Wagner. Scruples included the final screen appearance of Gene Tierney.

Plot
Wilhelmina Hunnewell Winthrop is a plain young woman, and a "poor relative" of the Winthrops, a wealthy Boston family. After she graduates from high school, she is given a sum of money by an aunt and goes to live in Paris with family friends. There, she undergoes a transformation of both body and soul, first losing weight, then gaining Parisian style under the guidance of Liliane, the elegant French woman who is her hostess. She is also introduced to Edouard, Liliane's nephew, who gives her the nickname "Billy". It is her first intimate love affair, but when the aristocratic but impecunious Edouard discovers that Billy is just a poor relative of the Winthrop family, he shows his true colors and ends the relationship.

Billy returns to America and moves to New York City, where she is hired by Ikehorn Enterprises as a secretary. During a business meeting in California, she becomes romantically involved with the wealthy CEO, Ellis Ikehorn, who is far older than she. The couple then marry and the next several years are happy ones, as Billy and Ellis live a glamorous life. However, Ellis later suffers a stroke, and Billy moves them from Manhattan to the exclusive Bel Air neighborhood of Los Angeles for the better climate.

Billy hires a male nurse, Jake Cassidy, to look after Ellis, but Billy lives as a recluse in their enormous house and looks aimlessly for some purpose in her life, eventually developing a compulsion to shop in Beverly Hills. Ellis advises her to find something to do at which she is good, perhaps in fashion. Sometime later, Ellis dies and leaves Billy an enormous fortune. Jake, motivated by debt, then tries to blackmail Billy, but fails.

Heeding Ellis's advice, Billy decides to open a luxury boutique on Rodeo Drive called "Scruples". She hires a young French designer, Valentine O'Neil, to design couture clothing for the customers, and also hires Valentine's close friend, Spider Elliot, a former fashion photographer, who becomes the creative director of the store. Valentine and Spider have a history of rocky relationships of their own, though, with Valentine first getting herself involved with her closeted gay boss and later with Billy's married attorney Josh Hillman, and Spider's involvement with troubled model-turned-actress, Melanie Adams.

With Scruples a success, Billy then marries Vito Orsini, a film director. As she is also part owner of a Hollywood studio (assets left to her by Ellis), she helps Vito to finance his new film, Mirrors. Studio boss Curt Arvey is not happy with Billy's interference in his studio, and intends to sabotage any chance of the film's success. During this scenario, Billy also becomes friends with Dolly Moon, a flamboyant supporting actress in Vito's film.

A power struggle later ensues when Curt Arvey attempts to confiscate Vito's film before it can be finished, and keeps it locked in the studio's vaults. Billy and Spider manage to steal the film back, so Vito can finish editing the film at home. Meanwhile, Billy is once again menaced by Jake Cassidy, who breaks into her home and attempts to rape her, but he is apprehended by the police just in time. The story ends as Vito's film wins an Academy Award for Best Picture, and Billy announces that she is pregnant with their first child. At the same time, Spider and Valentine realize that their long friendship has turned into love.

Cast
 Lindsay Wagner as Billy Ikehorn
 Barry Bostwick as Spider Elliott
 Marie-France Pisier as Valentine O'Neill
 Efrem Zimbalist, Jr. as Ellis Ikehorn
 Nick Mancuso as Vito Orsini
 Connie Stevens as Maggie McGregor
 Robert Reed as Josh Hilman
 Kim Cattrall as Melanie Adams
 Gavin MacLeod as Curt Arvey
 Gary Graham as Jake Cassidy
 Gene Tierney as Harriet Toppingham
 Milton Selzer as Sid Amos
 Michael Callan as Alan Wilton
 Louise Latham as Mary Ann Evans
 Anna Lee as Aunt Wilhelmina
 Gloria LeRoy as Rosie
 John Hancock as Lieutenant Tony Bakersmith
 Paul Carr as Pat O'Byrnne
 George Gaynes as John Prince
 Lelia Goldoni as Joanne Hillman
 Berry Berenson as Receptionist

History
Based on the bonkbuster novel by Judith Krantz, Scruples was a ratings success for the CBS network, capitalizing on the public's new-found taste for glossy television melodramas that would dominate the ratings for much of the 1980s, and for the miniseries format that had become popular with productions such as Rich Man, Poor Man (1976) and Roots (1977). Similar opulent productions based on bestselling novels ensued over the next few years, including Lace (1984), Hollywood Wives (1985), Sins (1986), and I'll Take Manhattan in 1987, which was also based on a novel by Krantz.

Due to the success of the miniseries, a pilot for a potential weekly series (featuring a different cast including Shelley Smith and Dirk Benedict) was produced in 1981, but was unsuccessful. In 2012, another pilot for a potential weekly series was made, starring Claire Forlani and Chad Michael Murray, but this, too, was unsuccessful.

Lindsay Wagner went on to appear in another Judith Krantz adaptation, Princess Daisy, in 1983. Barry Bostwick also appeared in the TV adaptations of Krantz's novels I'll Take Manhattan in 1987 and Till We Meet Again in 1989.

Home media
Scruples was released on a double-cassette home video in the mid-1990s by Warner Home Video.

The film was released on DVD in 2008, but only in Australia (region 4). In January 2010, Warner Bros. made the miniseries available on DVD in the U.S. as a three-disc set via the Warner Archive Collection, an online service in which customers could purchase "made-to-order" DVDs from the Warner Bros. library.

References

External links
 

1980s American television miniseries
Television shows based on American novels
1980 American television series debuts
1980s American LGBT-related drama television series
Adaptations of works by Judith Krantz